Baroona was an electoral district of the Legislative Assembly in the Australian state of Queensland from 1935 to 1977.

It mostly covered the inner western suburbs of Brisbane. It was mostly a safe seat for the Labor Party, but was won by the Liberal Party in the 1974 election.

It was abolished in the redistribution before the 1977 election, and its territory divided between the districts of Brisbane Central, Ithaca and Ashgrove.

Members for Baroona

Election results

See also
 Electoral districts of Queensland
 Members of the Queensland Legislative Assembly by year
 :Category:Members of the Queensland Legislative Assembly by name

References

Former electoral districts of Queensland
1935 establishments in Australia
1977 establishments in Australia
Constituencies established in 1935
Constituencies disestablished in 1977